The Kirkland Tennis Challenger was a tournament for professional female tennis players played on outdoor hard courts. The event was classified as a $50,000 ITF Women's Circuit tournament and was held in Kirkland, Washington, United States, in 2015.

Past finals

Singles

Doubles

External links 
 ITF search
 Official website

ITF Women's World Tennis Tour
Hard court tennis tournaments in the United States
Tennis in Washington (state)